Mateusz Kupczak (born 20 February 1992) is a Polish professional footballer who plays as a defensive midfielder for Warta Poznań.

References

External links
 
 

1992 births
Living people
People from Żywiec
Polish footballers
Association football midfielders
Bruk-Bet Termalica Nieciecza players
Podbeskidzie Bielsko-Biała players
GKS Tychy players
Warta Poznań players
Ekstraklasa players
I liga players
II liga players